Idaea basinta, the red-and-white wave, is a species of geometrid moth in the family Geometridae. It was described by William Schaus in 1901 and is found in Central and North America.

The MONA or Hodges number for Idaea basinta is 7110.

References

 Scoble, Malcolm J., ed. (1999). Geometrid Moths of the World: A Catalogue (Lepidoptera, Geometridae), 1016.

Further reading

 Arnett, Ross H. (2000). American Insects: A Handbook of the Insects of America North of Mexico. CRC Press.

External links

 Butterflies and Moths of North America

Sterrhini
Moths described in 1901